Heritage Radio Network is an independent 501(c)3 non-profit covering the world of food, drink and agriculture. The member-supported radio station has more than one million monthly listeners in over 200 countries.

History 
In 2009, largely inspired by Carlo Petrini and his pirate radio station in Italy, Radio Bra Onde Rosse, Patrick Martins founded the Heritage Radio Network in the back of Roberta's in Bushwick, Brooklyn. The radio studio was built using two re-purposed twenty-foot shipping containers.

Since its inception, Heritage Radio Network has broadcast more than 4,000 shows and produced more than 30 regular weekly programs about such topics as food technology, beer, cheese, food history and politics, and cocktails. Shows feature guests ranging from chefs, food policy analysts, farmers, restaurateurs, musicians and artists. Previous guests have included Alice Waters, Michael Pollan, Joan Dye Gussow, Éric Ripert, Florence Fabricant, Marion Nestle, Danny Meyer, Jamie Oliver, Anthony Bourdain and more. All shows are archived and accessible on the Heritage Radio Network website and through iTunes and Stitcher Radio.

Programming

Ongoing series

Snacky Tunes
Hosted by Greg and Darin Bresnitz, a pair of twins with long-running connections to the worlds of hospitality and music, Snacky Tunes is a talk show that pairs interviews with chefs and musicians. Most episodes include live musical performances interspersed with the musicians' interviews.

Former and limited-run series

Awards and accolades

In February 2013, Heritage Radio Network was named one of Saveur 100 Favorite things of 2013. Heritage Radio Network is the recipient of a grant from The Julia Child Foundation for Gastronomy and Culinary Arts.

References

Former pirate radio stations
Internet radio stations in the United States

Radio stations established in 2009
Podcasting companies